The Honourable Wally Norman is a 2003 Australian comedy film directed by Ted Emery. It stars Kevin Harrington, Shaun Micallef, and Greig Pickhaver.

It was filmed primarily in South Australia and was nominated for two AFI awards.

Plot
The story begins with a corrupt Member of Parliament (Micallef) shutting down a country town's main source of employment in the local meatworks. This leaves Wally Norman (Harrington) out of a job, until drunk politician Willy Norman accidentally writes the wrong name on the parliamentary nomination form.

Wally is at first apprehensive about running, until he realises it is the only way to save the meatworks. Throughout the film Wally is coached by Willy Norman and assistant Myles Greenstreet (Nathaniel Davison) in how to best appeal to the voters, as well as overcome his fear of public speaking.

Meanwhile, Myles is attracted to Wally's daughter, and a wombat's career skyrockets.

Much of the film's humour comes from wordplay, such as naming the town Givens Head, and the foreman of the meatworks being named George. Shaun Micallef said he had to insist that his own moniker was modified from F. Ken Oath to F. Ken Oats to soften one of the film's less subtle attempts at punning.

Cast
 Kevin Harrington as Wally Norman
 Alan Cassell as Willy Norman
 Shaun Micallef as Ken Oats
 Rosalind Hammond as Dolly Norman
 Nathaniel Davison as Myles Greenstreet
 Greig Pickhaver as The Chairman
 Octavia Barron-Martin as Laurie Norman
 Tom Budge as Normie Norman
 Bryan Dawe as Richard Nicholls
 Melissa Madden-Gray as Rebecca-Jane Thompson
 Paul Kelman as Gary
 Reg Evans as Barry
Paul Makin as Alan Unwin Bookmaker

Filming
The Honorable Wally Norman was filmed in various areas of South Australia. It used the towns of Lobethal, Mount Barker and Nairne for the town in the movie. The town of Lobethal provided the hotel, Mount Barker provided the meatworks and the St Francis de Sales College, and Nairne hosted the main street for the billy-cart race shown near the beginning of the movie.

Mike Rann, at that time Premier of South Australia, had a cameo appearance at 1:12:10 in the film. He played the man who was thrown out of his seat by The Chairman.

Critical reception
The Sydney Morning Herald described the film as: "dreary, like being offered a dried-out chop, fake mash and over-cooked broccoli, when you were invited over for a juicy lamb roast." SBS said "The Honourable Wally Norman seriously lacks bite; it's a determinably retro affair, amiable and mildly amusing, but pretty bland."  Urban Cinefile dismissed the film as "a shallow and contrived affair with the occasional shadow of humour passing over it."

Box office
The Honourable Wally Norman grossed $181,395 at the box office in Australia.

See also
 Cinema of Australia
 South Australian Film Corporation

References

External links
 
 moviehole.net review
The Honourable Wally Norman at the National Film and Sound Archive

2003 films
Australian comedy films
2003 comedy films
Films about elections
Films about politicians
Films about democracy
2000s English-language films